Medicina is an Italian comune with c. 16,000 inhabitants in the Metropolitan City of Bologna, part of the region of Emilia-Romagna.

Name

The origins of its name (which in Italian means "medicine") are quite uncertain, and many hypotheses have been put forward. A legend tells that the Emperor Frederick Barbarossa, passing through Medicina from Milan fell ill and miraculously recovered because of a snake that accidentally came into the pot of his soup. It has been proved, though, that Barbarossa did pass through Medicina but that the name of the town predates that time. In memory of this legend the Festa del Barbarossa ("Barbarossa's party") takes place every year on the 3rd weekend of September.

Science
A radio observatory named "Croce del Nord" (Cross of the North) is located near Medicina (in the village of Fiorentina). It is operated by the Istituto di Radioastronomia di Bologna (Institute for Radio Astronomy of Bologna), created by the CNR (National association for Research) and now part of the INAF and there is an identical one in Noto, Sicily.

Sport
Medicina has a football and a basketball team, both playing in lower leagues, as well as a cycling team and a cycling development center for youth.

In August 2010 Medicina hosted six matches of the 2010 ICC World Cricket League Division Four, organised by Italy.

Giovanni Caprara, trainer of the Russian women volleyball team which won the World Championship in 2006, is a native of Medicina.

Twin towns
 Škofja Loka, Slovenia
 Romilly-sur-Seine, France

References

External links 
 
Official website of the Municipal Band of Medicina 

Cities and towns in Emilia-Romagna